Diadelia bispina is a species of beetle in the family Cerambycidae. It was described by Fairmaire in 1904.

References

Diadelia
Beetles described in 1904